The 1920–21 Toronto St. Patricks season was the Toronto National Hockey League (NHL) franchise's fourth season, second as the St. Patricks. The club won the regular season schedule, but lost in the playoffs and did not play for the Stanley Cup.

Offseason

Regular season

Final standings

Record vs. opponents

Schedule and results

Playoffs
The St. Patricks qualified first in the second half and played the Senators for the league championship. The Senators defeated the St. Patricks (5–0 and 2–0) to progress to the Stanley Cup final against the Vancouver Millionaires, who they also defeated three games to two.

Player statistics

Scorers

Awards and records

Transactions
 December 4, 1920: Loaned Babe Dye to the Hamilton Tigers
 December 15, 1920: Signed Free Agent Rod Smylie
 December 16, 1920: Traded Howard Lockhart to the Hamilton Tigers for cash
 December 24, 1920: Babe Dye returned to Toronto from Hamilton Tigers
 January 25, 1921: Acquired Sprague Cleghorn from Hamilton Tigers for future considerations
 March 15, 1921: Released Sprague Cleghorn

References

Toronto St. Patricks seasons
Toronto
Toronto